Poding Memorial Library is the library at Chaoyang University of Technology in Wufeng District, Taichung, Taiwan, established in 1994. The construction of the new library building began in June 1997, and was completed in March 1999.

History 
The first class of Chaoyang University of Technology started in August 1994, and the library opened on October 11 of the same year. The third floor of the university's Teaching Building temporarily served as the library's quarters. It was divided into a periodical and reference room, stacks, and a reading room. Afterward, the collection of the library increased so rapidly that  in order to satisfy the needs of users it became necessary to add western book stacks and more separate rooms in November 1996. After a year of planning, the construction of the new library building began on June 28, 1997, and was completed in March 1999.

Library Holdings Information 

Update: 13/10/2011

Service 
Reading Services
Loan Services
Information Retrieval Services
Multi-media Services
Outreach Activities
Copy Utilities
Book Search Services
Book Recommendation services
Rush Catalog Request
Reference Services
Inter-Library Cooperation
Reserved Books
Subject Advisor service

Library Floor Plan

See also 
Chaoyang University of Technology

References

1994 establishments in Taiwan
Academic libraries in Taiwan
Library buildings completed in 1999
Libraries established in 1994
Libraries in Taichung